North Allegheny Senior High School (NASH) is a suburban high school in the North Allegheny School District and is located in Wexford, Pennsylvania, a northern suburb of Pittsburgh, Pennsylvania. The current building was built in 1974. In 2013, enrollment was 1,277 pupils in grades 11th and 12th, with 3% of pupils from a low income home. In 2013, North Allegheny Senior High School employed 98 teachers. The feeder school is North Allegheny Intermediate High School which provides grades 9th and 10th.

According to the National Center for Education Statistics, in 2010, North Allegheny Senior High School reported an enrollment of 1,314 pupils in grades 11th and 12th. The school employed 98 teachers, yielding a student–teacher ratio of 13:1.

Former principal Dr. Lawrence Butterini was recognized by the Pennsylvania Association of Elementary and Secondary School Principals as the Pennsylvania High School Principal of the Year in 2006. Butterini was NASH principal and a figurehead of the school until his retirement following the 2009-2010 school year.

North Allegheny Senior High school students may choose to attend A W Beattie Career Center for training in the trades. The Allegheny Intermediate Unit IU3 provides the school with a wide variety of services like specialized education for disabled students and hearing, speech and visual disability services and professional development for staff and faculty.

Extracurriculars
The district offers a wide variety of clubs, activities and an extensive sports program. North Allegheny Senior High School won the MSA Cup, a local scholastic trophy similar to the Director's Cup, every year the honor has been awarded.  It is also home to AFJROTC unit PA-022.

In December 2010 and 2012 the football team won PIAA and WPIAL Class AAAA football state titles, claiming the state in two out of three years.

Athletics
Number of Team State Championships
(11) Cross Country (Men's)-  1960 (AAA), 1961 (AAA), 1962 (AAA), 1965 (AAA), 1968 (AAA), 1970 (AAA), 1971 (AAA), 1974 (AAA), 1980 (AAA), 1997 (AAA), 2010 (AAA) 
(6) Swimming and Diving (Women's) -  1984, 1991, 1992, 1995 (AAA), 1996 (AAA), 1997 (AAA)
(9) Volleyball (Men's)-  1979, 1987, 1991, 1999, 2013, 2018, 2019, 2020 , 2021 
(4) Swimming and Diving (Men's) -  1994 (AAA), 2009 (AAA), 2010 (AAA), 2017 (AAA), 2018 (AAA)
(4) Tennis (Women's) -  2008 (AAA), 2013 (AAA), 2014 (AAA), 2015 (AAA)
(9) Volleyball (Women's) -  1992 (AAA), 1993 (AAA), 1994 (AAA), 2017 (AAAA), 2018 {AAAA}, 2019 {AAAA}, 2020 {AAAA}, 2021 {AAAA}, 2022 {AAAA} 
(3) Football -  1990 (AAAA), 2010 (AAAA), 2012 (AAAA)
(3) Cross Country (Women's)-  1975 (AAA), 1998 (AAA), 1999 (AAA)
(2) Baseball - 1996 (AAA), 2000 (AAA)  
(2) Ice Hockey -  2007 (AAA), 2013 (AAA) 
(2) Tennis (Men's) -  2005 (AAA), 2009 (AAA)  
(1) Golf (Women's) -  2015 (AAA)
(1) Soccer (Men's) -  2000 (AAA)

The district funds-

Varsity

Boys
Baseball - AAAA
Basketball- AAAA
Bowling - AAAA
Cross Country - AAA
Football - AAAA
Golf - AAA
Indoor Track and Field - AAAA
Lacrosse - AAAA
Soccer - AAAA
Swimming and Diving - AAA
Tennis - AAA
Track and Field - AAA
Volleyball - AAA
Water Polo - AAAA
Wrestling - AAA

Girls
Basketball - AAAA
Bowling - AAAA
Cheer - AAAA
Cross Country - AAA
Field Hockey - AAA
Golf - AAA
Gymnastics - AAAA
Indoor Track and Field - AAAA
Lacrosse - AAAA
Soccer (Fall) - AAAA
Softball - AAAA
Swimming and Diving - AAA
Girls' Tennis - AAA
Track and Field - AAA
Volleyball - AAA
Water Polo - AAAA

According to PIAA directory July 2013

Newman Stadium & Baierl Center

NASH is also a hub for North Allegheny Athletics.  It is located right next to Carl A. Newman Stadium, which houses numerous sports, with football being one of its attractions, as the North Allegheny Varsity Football team plays all home games there during their fall sports season. Newman Stadium was named after Carl A. Newman, a former North Allegheny superintendent and the main contributor to the stadium.

Next to Newman Stadium is the Baierl Center, which is a fitness center for North Allegheny Athletics and also has two gyms for cheerleading and practice squads, with one large track on the upper level which is left for baseball, softball, and the rowing team.  The Baierl Center includes a weight room, an activity room, an exercise center, and a track.  It is open free of charge to North Allegheny Athletics and also is available to district residents for a membership fee.  The center is a  building that was available for public use since 2002 and expanded in 2004, opening a room solely for indoor biking.

Notable alumni
Brian Baschnagel - former football player
Thomas Keiser - football player
Michael Bergdahl - business speaker and author
Melissa Hart - former US representative
Warren Hoburg - NASA astronaut
Jessica Jackley - entrepreneur and co-founder of Kiva
Tim Manoa - former professional football player
Mike McMahon - former NFL player
Frank Nicotero - comedian
Mark Nordenberg - chancellor of the University of Pittsburgh
Richard Rossi (1981) writer-director 
Gregg Garrity, former NFL player
Cory Sullivan, MLB player
Dan Smyers, Singer, Dan + Shay
Ayden Owens-Delerme, Decathlete

References

Educational institutions established in 1974
Public high schools in Pennsylvania
Schools in Allegheny County, Pennsylvania
Education in Pittsburgh area
1974 establishments in Pennsylvania